You've Changed Records is a Canadian independent record label founded in 2009 by Daniel Romano, Ian Kehoe of Attack in Black and Steve Lambke of Constantines.

Although both of the owners' primary bands released their records on other labels at the time, they formed You've Changed to release a split EP as well as material by their side projects. Romano has released a collaboration with Julie Doiron and Frederick Squire, Daniel, Fred & Julie, and several solo albums, while Lambke released Dog Weather and Bone Soldiers as Baby Eagle, and Kehoe has released music under the band name Marine Dreams.

In addition, the label has released material by Apollo Ghosts, Shotgun Jimmie, Richard Laviolette, Partner, The Weather Station, Status/Non-Status, Leanne Betasamosake Simpson, The Burning Hell and Julie Doiron, as well as picking up distribution rights to albums by Adam and the Amethysts and The Luyas which were originally released on the now-defunct Pome Records.

Discography

References

External links

Record labels established in 2007
Canadian independent record labels
Indie rock record labels